The Reardon Building also known as the Carmel Dairy Building is a Spanish Eclectic style two-story commercial building in downtown Carmel-by-the-Sea, California. The Reardon building is an example of early inventive commercial design for advertising and marketing. The building was designated as a significant commercial building in the city's Downtown Historic District Property Survey, and was recorded with the Department of Parks and Recreation on January 20, 2002. Since 2001, the building has been occupied by Palomas Home Furnishings.

History

The Reardon Building was named for Thomas B. Reardon, a Carmel pioneer who arrived in 1906. He was a member of the Carmel Arts and Crafts Club and the Forest Theater. He served on the Carmel City Council from 1919 to 1924 and was founder of the Carmel Savings & Loan Association. The Reardon estate hired architect Guy O. Koepp to design the building for the Carmel Dairy, a business owned by Earl F. Graft, who was in the dairy business for 27 years.

The Carmel Dairy sold milk products produced by the William Hatton Dairy and the Martin farm (now occupied by the Mission Ranch). Caryle Stoney was the original contractor. Jo Mora was commissioned by Graft to decorate the building. Mora made three large interior dairy murals above a soda fountain (no longer present) and a sculptured a metal lamp in the shape of a cowbell that still hangs above the buildings front door. He showed animal figures dressed as humans, many recognizable as local Carmel residents. He also designed the menus, Christmas cards, and milk bottles, with these animal characterizations, and a cow that served as the logo. The Santa Rosa Republican described Mora's work with an article having the title: "Carmel's Prosaic Dairy is Art."

The Carmel Dairy sign still exists on the exterior of the building along Mission Street. Koepp's designed a corner tower to resemble a milk bottle shaped polygonal tower and a Mission tile cap as the exterior centerpiece. The building is located on Ocean Avenue and Mission Street. The Stucco walls, arcaded windows, and title roof are examples of conventional Spanish Eclectic style. The building is significant example of early inventive commercial design for advertising and marketing. It is also one of the buildings that represents Carmel's Downton Historic District.

The building was reviewed in the Carmel Pine Cone on March 17, 1932, saying: 

The Carmel Diary went out of business at the end of World War II, and the building was leased as a soda fountain for several years. In 1953, the Italian grocer Joe Bileci and Horace Coniglio moved his Mediterranean Market from San Carlos Street to the Carmel Dairy building. They added Portuguese tiles on either side of the entry as well as Spanish design exterior light fixtures. In 1955, Bileci hired architect Francis Palms to remodel the rear of the building. After 40 years in business, the Mediterranean Market was closed in 2001.

Guy O. Koepp

Architect Guy Oran Koepp (1896–1959) was born on May 19, 1896, in Oregon. His parents were Albert F. Koepp (1867-1930) and Laura Ellen Baker (1869-1945). He was a graduate of the University of Oregon.

He served in World War I with an aviation corps at Long Island, New York.

He married Gertrude Beulah Elizabeth Zahrah Lee (1893-1960) on December 31, 1924, in Hollywood, California and had five children. He also had one second son and one daughter with Josiah Koeth.

He was a Carmel building designer who came to Carmel in the early 1920s. He designed the Reardon Building (1928), American Legion Post No. 512 (1928), La Rambla Building (1929), E. H. Cox House (1930), Reardon Building (1932), Goold Building (1935), and other buildings in Carmel-by-the-Sea.

He died on August 3. 1959, in Los Angeles, California, at age 63. Private funeral services were held at the Pierce Bros. Hollywood Mortuary.

See also
 Human–animal hybrid

References

External links

 Downtown Conservation District Historic Property Survey
 In Public Places, the Sculpture and Architectural Adornment Work of Jo Mora

1932 establishments in California
Carmel-by-the-Sea, California
Buildings and structures in Monterey County, California
Spanish Colonial Revival architecture in California